The Common Flash, Bidaspa nissa (or Rapala nissa) is  a species of lycaenid or blue butterfly found in India.

References 

Deudorigini
Butterflies of Asia
Butterflies described in 1844